Natale Attanasio (1845 – 1923) was an Italian painter. He painted diverse subjects from period pieces, Oriental fantasies, altarpieces, portraits, and genre works, and worked both in fresco and oil.

Biography
In 1874, Attanasio won a stipend from his native Catania to study in Naples at the Institute of Fine Arts under Domenico Morelli, and then moved to Rome. His painting Sunt lacrimae rerum. Le pazze, depicting women at an insane asylum, won the gold medal at the 1891 Exposition of Palermo. Among his other works Bernardo Palissy and the Orfano dell'Annunciata. He died in Rome.

Gallery

References

1845 births
1923 deaths
People from Catania
19th-century Italian painters
20th-century Italian painters
Painters from Sicily